Ignacio Romo Porchas (July 17, 1924 – March 11, 2007) played for the Mexico national basketball team in the 1948 Summer Olympics in London.

He was born in Guaymas, Sonora, but moved to Mexicali at age five and subsequently lived in Tijuana. He died in Calexico, California, United States.

Romo was a member of the first class of inductees into the Mexicali Salón de la Fama de Deportes (Mexicali Sports Hall of Fame) in Mexicali, Baja California.

References

External links
 

1924 births
2007 deaths
Mexican men's basketball players
Olympic basketball players of Mexico
Basketball players at the 1948 Summer Olympics
Basketball players from Sonora
People from Guaymas
Basketball players from Baja California
Sportspeople from Mexicali
Sportspeople from Tijuana